The 2016 SABA Championship was the 5th SABA Championship, and the qualifying event in the SABA subzone, one of the FIBA Asia's subzone for the 2016 FIBA Asia Challenge. The games were held from 6 July to 8 July in Bengaluru, India.

 successfully defended their title by sweeping the tournament, 3–0, winning the subzone title and the subzone's lone spot for the main tournament.

After a three-way tie for the second spot,  notched their first podium finish by winning the point differential against third-place  and fourth-place .

Venue 
The Kanteerava Indoor Stadium was set to host the games for the second successive year.

Standings

Results

Final rankings

Awards

References 

2015
2016–17 in Asian basketball
2016 in Indian sport
International basketball competitions hosted by India